Miroslav Matea Giuchici (born 27 February 1980) is a Romanian former footballer who played as a striker. His father who was also named Miroslav Giuchici was also a footballer.

Honours
UM Timișoara
Divizia B: 2000–01
Apulum Alba Iulia
Divizia B: 2002–03

References

1980 births
Living people
Romanian people of Serbian descent
Romanian footballers
Association football forwards
Liga I players
Liga II players
FC Steaua București players
CSM Unirea Alba Iulia players
FC CFR Timișoara players
FC Petrolul Ploiești players
ACF Gloria Bistrița players
FC Brașov (1936) players
CS Pandurii Târgu Jiu players
CSM Jiul Petroșani players
Sportspeople from Timișoara